Ryan Foster (born 26 August 1988) is an Australian middle distance runner and coach who specialises in the 800 metres. He graduated from Pennsylvania State University in 2011. He won four Big Ten 800 metres titles, was an All-American over 800 metres and the mile run. Ryan holds two Australian National records: the indoor 800 metres and the indoor 1000 metres, as well as five school records: indoor 800 metres, indoor 1000 metres, indoor mile, indoor distance medley relay, outdoor sprint medley relay. Ryan was also the first Tasmanian to break the 4-minute mile barrier.

Personal best

Australian National records

Coaching career
In 2016, Foster was hired as the head cross country coach at Division II Edinboro University of Pennsylvania. Prior to Edinboro, he served as an assistant coach at Penn State. He would coach there for 2 seasons before joining the University of Tennessee as an assistant in 2018.  In 2021, he decided to return to his alma mater to coach.

Notable teammates
Casimir Loxsom

References

External links
"http://www.gopsusports.com/sports/c-track/mtt/foster_ryan00.html" Penn State Nittany Lions bio]

1988 births
Living people
Australian male sprinters
Penn State Nittany Lions men's track and field athletes
Sportspeople from Hobart